The Takahue River is a river of the Northland Region of New Zealand's North Island. It initially flows southwest from its sources in the Maungataniwha Range before turning north. It passes the settlement of Takahue before reaching the Victoria River seven kilometres east of Kaitaia.

See also
List of rivers of New Zealand

References

Far North District
Rivers of the Northland Region
Rivers of New Zealand